Sweedie (also known as My Sweedie, The Swedish Maid) is a fictional character portrayed by actor Wallace Beery in drag in a series of comedy films from 1914 to 1916. The series is notable as the means by which Beery, a particularly masculine actor (which is the series' joke), first made his name in the film industry.

List of Sweedie films
 Sweedie the Swatter (July 13, 1914)
 Sweedie and the Lord (1914)
 Topsy-Turvy Sweedie (1914)
 Sweedie and the Double Exposure (1914)
 Sweedie Springs a Surprise (1914)
 Sweedie's Skate (1914)
 Sweedie's Clean-Up (1914)
 Golf Champion 'Chick' Evans Links with Sweedie (1914)
 The Fickleness of Sweedie (1914)
 Sweedie Learns to Swim (1914)
 She Landed a Big One (aka She Landed a Lord) (1914)
 Sweedie the Laundress (1914)
 Sweedie the Trouble Maker (1914)
 Countess Sweedie (1914)
 Sweedie at the Fair (1914)
 A Maid of War (1914)
 Sweedie and the Hypnotist (1914)
 Sweedie Collects for Charity (1914)
 Sweedie and the Sultan's Present (1915)
 Sweedie's Suicide (1915)
 Sweedie and Her Dog (1915)
 The New Teacher (1915)
 Sweedie Goes to College (1915)
 Sweedie's Hopeless Love (1915)
 Sweedie Learns to Ride (1915)
 Sweedie in Vaudeville (1915)
 Sweedie's Hero (1915)
 Sweedie's Finish (1915)
 Sweedie, the Janitor (1916)

See also 
 Cross-gender acting

References

American film series